Fair Meadows is a historic home located at Creswell, Harford County, Maryland.  It is a -story Second Empire–style house constructed in 1868 for the last owner of Harford Furnace, Clement Dietrich. The house is constructed of irregularly laid ashlar and features a mansard roof, cupola, dormers with rounded hoods, and stone quoins.  The interior has a center hall plan and includes intricate inlay designs, black and white marble tiles in the center hall, plaster ceiling ornaments and friezes, marble mantels, and original crystal chandeliers. Also on the property are the ruins of a round springhouse, a one-story stone carriage house, a brick smokehouse, and three hip-roofed coursed rubble stone outbuildings.  The estate was later home to Eastern Christian College.

The house was listed on the National Register of Historic Places in 1980.

On May 3, 2020, a devastating fire caused extensive damage to the building.

References

External links
, including photo from 1979, Maryland Historical Trust website

Houses on the National Register of Historic Places in Maryland
Houses in Harford County, Maryland
Houses completed in 1868
National Register of Historic Places in Harford County, Maryland
1868 establishments in Maryland